Lecithocera sikkimella is a moth in the family Lecithoceridae. It was described by Aristide Caradja in 1920. It is found in Sikkim, India.

References

Moths described in 1920
sikkimella